Alhaji Usman Faruk (born 1932 died 18 December 2020) was the first Military Governor of North-Western State in Nigeria from 1967 to 1975 after it was split off from the old Northern Region during the military regime of General Yakubu Gowon.
He was dismissed from office by General Murtala Mohammed, who took power in a coup on 29 July 1975, and who then launched a probe that found him guilty of illegally enriching himself while in office.
He was later reinstated by the Ibrahim Badamasi Babangida regime after being cleared of all charges, and was given his full benefits and retirement rank.
Shortly after he left office, the state was split into Niger State and Sokoto State.

1988 pamphlet
Faruk published a pamphlet in 1988 that attacked the national population control program that the Nigerian military government was advocating. In it, he said that "No good Muslim will ever accept any human directive which contravenes the laws of Allah." He said that widespread promotion of anti-pregnancy drugs and devices would lead to "an earthquake of moral laxity."
This view, common in the North, may have contributed to the spread of AIDS and polio.

Community marketing board
Faruk supported establishing a commodity marketing board to fix or control the prices of produce and animals such as cows, goats and sheep.
The board would also preserve produce for times of need, and would set up processing companies for perishable produce such as tomatoes and other vegetables.

Police commissioner
Faruk was a former Commissioner of Police. In a 2006 press interview, he said that the poor pay and equipment of the police could not be justified, and was the cause of the state of insecurity in the country.

Awards and honours
Faruk was awarded Commander of the Order of the Niger (CON) by the Olusegun Obasanjo administration in September 2006.

Personal life and death
In July 2009, his third son, Police Superintendent Abdulaziz Faruk, was killed during violence in Maiduguri triggered by the Boko Haram extreme Islamist sect.

Faruk was reported dead in December 2020.

Bibliography

References

1935 births
2020 deaths
Nigerian military personnel
Nigerian military governors of Sokoto State
Commanders of the Order of the Niger